The Internal Audit Service is the title of several government bodies responsible for internal audit:

Philippines
 At the Department of the Interior and Local Government
 At the Department of Health (Philippines)
 At the Department of Budget and Management
 At the Department of National Defense (Philippines)
 At the Department of Trade and Industry (Philippines)

Elsewhere
Internal Audit Service (European Commission)
 At the Ministry of Defence (Slovenia)
 The United States Army Audit Agency
 The South African Army Inspector-General

See also
 Audit Commission (disambiguation), any of several national governments' internal audit bodies
 Auditor general
 Comptroller general (disambiguation)